The 2008 Badminton Asia Championships is the 27th tournament of the Badminton Asia Championships. It was held in Johor Bahru, Malaysia from April 15 to April 20, 2008.

Medalists

Medal count

Results

Finals

Semi-finals

External links
https://bwfbadminton.com/results/422/yonex-sunrise-badminton-asia-championships-2008/2008-04-20

Badminton Asia Championships
Asian Badminton Championships
Badminton tournaments in Malaysia
2008 in Malaysian sport